Slobodna Europa (Slovak: 'Free Europe') may refer to:

 Radio Free Europe/Radio Liberty, a US-sponsored radio station
 Slobodná Európa, a Slovak punk-rock group formed in 1990